Uta-Maria Heim (born 14 October 1963) is a German writer.

Life
Heim was born in Schramberg in Germany on 14 October 1963. She went to the University at Freiberg studying literature and sociology before taking her master's degree in Stuttgart. She then worked as a critic for the newspaper Stuttgarter Zeitung.

By 2006 she was a freelance writer creating radio plays, poems, plays and crime novels based in southern Germany.

Awards
 1992 German Crime Fiction Prize (National 3) for the Rats Principle
 1994 German Crime Fiction Prize (National 2) for the City of Cockroaches
 1994 Berlin Art Prize (Literature Award)
 1998 Fellowship of the Villa Massimo
 2000 Friedrich Glauser Prize for Little Angel end

References

1963 births
Living people
People from Schramberg
German women dramatists and playwrights
21st-century German dramatists and playwrights
German women poets
Writers from Baden-Württemberg
German women novelists
21st-century German women writers
Stuttgarter Zeitung people